Battle of the Chefs: Harare is a Zimbabwean reality competition television series which premiered on August 30, 2015 on Zimbabwe Broadcasting Corporation. The show features sixteen contestants competing across five rounds. It is open to both amateur and professional chefs.

Show format

Basic format 
Battle of the Chefs is a cooking show that uses a progressive elimination format. From season 2 onwards, each season starts with sixteen contestants, with one chef eliminated in each episode until four finalists remain to battle for the title of Best Chef in Zimbabwe.

Each episode features three challenges designed to test the chefs' technique, creativity, and knowledge of food and flavour. The expert panel of three judges score the chefs' efforts during the episodes. In the end the chef with the highest score wins either an advantage or a prize; and the chef with the lowest score is stripped of their chef's jacket.

In the Technical Challenge the chefs are asked to produce their take on a basic dish. In the Innovation Challenge, they are given a basket containing three key ingredients they must use to create their most innovative dish. In the Set Recipe Challenge they are given a somewhat complex recipe to follow.

Variant formats 
Season 1 of the show had sixteen teams,  each consisting of two individuals. In each episode, a team of chefs is required to prepare three dishes: starter, main course and dessert.

In season 2 onwards the Judges Masterclass Round features an Identification Challenge where the chefs are expected to identify a number of mystery ingredients, as well as the Replication Challenge where the chefs must watch one of the judges give a recipe demo and then replicate it. In the Semifinal Round there is a Shopping Challenge, and the Innovation Challenge requires the chefs to produce a creative platter of multiple items. The finale requires the chefs to produce a signature three course menu.

Seasons

Season 1 (2015)

Contestants

Episodes

Season 2 (2016)
Season 2 was shot in a custom built studio in Borrowdale - Harare.

Naming sponsor - TM Pick n Pay

Contestant Progress

Episodes

Season 3 (2017)
Season 3 was shot in a custom built studio in Msasa, Harare

Naming sponsor - TM Pick n Pay

Contestants

Episodes

Season 4 
The show's fourth season began pre-production in 2018 - with auditions taking place in August. However, following the renewed economic crisis in Zimbabwe, production was put on hold indefinitely.

Judges 
Judging is done by consensus among a panel of experts selected from Zimbabwe's hospitality industry, the majority of whom are restaurant owners, consultants, and executive chefs with hospitality background and experience.

Chefs' Competitions (off season/offline)
The inaugural Chefs' Competition in association with Battle of the Chefs was held on 5 August 2017. The following chefs competed:

A similar event was held featuring journalists in the Media Cook Off on 9 August 2017, hosted by season 3 finalist Cherron Harry.

See also
Iron Chef

References

Food reality television series
Cooking competitions
2015 television series debuts
2010s reality television series
2010s cooking television series
Zimbabwean television shows